Dabney may refer to:

Places in the United States
Dabney, Arkansas, an unincorporated community
Dabney, Indiana, an unincorporated community
Dabney, Kentucky, an unincorporated community
Dabney, North Carolina, an unincorporated community
Dabney, Texas, a former mining community
Dabney, West Virginia, an unincorporated community
Dabneys, Virginia, an unincorporated community
Dabney State Recreation Area, Oregon

Other uses
 Dabney House, an undergraduate student residence at the California Institute of Technology
 Dabney Oil Syndicate
 Humperdink Duck, also known as Dabney Duck, is a Disney character, paternal grandfather of Donald Duck

People with the given name
 Dabney Carr (Virginia assemblyman) (1743–1773), member of the Virginia House of Burgesses and brother-in-law of Thomas Jefferson
 Dabney Cosby (c. 1793–1862), American architect
 Dabney Coleman (born 1932), American actor
 Dabney dos Santos (born 1996), Dutch footballer
 Dabney L. Friedrich (born 1967), American attorney, serving as United States district court judge
 Dabney H. Maury (1822–1900), U.S. Army officer and American Civil War Confederate major general 
 Dabney Montgomery (1923–2016), African-American World War II soldier, member of the Tuskegee Airmen, and bodyguard to Martin Luther King Jr.

People with the surname
 Augusta Dabney (1918–2008), American actress
 Austin Dabney (c. 1765–1830), freed slave and militiaman in the American Revolutionary War
 Charles W. Dabney (1794–1871), US consul in the Azores 1826–1871, industrialist
 Charles William Dabney (1855–1945), President of the University of Tennessee
 Ford Dabney (1883–1958), American ragtime pianist, composer, and band leader
 George Dabney (1808–1868), American educator and anti-slavery activist
 John Dabney (1752–1819), postmaster, publisher and bookseller in Salem, Massachusetts
 John A. Dabney (1903–1991), American general
 John Bass Dabney (1766–1826), industrialist and US consul in the Azores 1806-1826
 Robert Lewis Dabney (1820–1898), American minister and theologian

 Sharon Dabney (born 1959), American retired sprinter
 Stephanie Dabney (1958–2022), American ballerina
 Ted Dabney (1937–2018), co-founder of Atari Computers
 Virginius Dabney (1901–1995), American teacher, journalist, writer, and editor
 Wendell Phillips Dabney (1865–1952), American musician, civil rights activist, author, newspaper editor and publisher
 William Dabney (disambiguation)